The Formula Regional Americas Championship powered by Honda (formerly the F3 Americas Championship powered by Honda) is an FIA Formula Regional racing series that competes in the United States, with plans in the future to race in Canada and Mexico. The championship is sanctioned by SCCA Pro Racing, the professional racing division of the Sports Car Club of America, in conjunction with the Automobile Competition Committee for the United States, the United States representative to the FIA. Starting in 2020 the champion will win a scholarship to compete in Indy Lights.  The F3 Americas Championship is updating its name to Formula Regional Americas Championship Powered by Honda in 2020.

Championship format
Each event of the championship consists of three races, which are run on the support package of other motorsport events across North America. The top 8 in points standings receive FIA Super License points.

Car
The championship utilizes a spec chassis for all competitors, this being the Ligier JS F3 chassis. This chassis features  the halo device, which was also implemented in Formula One and Formula 2 in 2018.

Specifications (2018–present)
 Engine displacement: Honda K20C1  DOHC inline-4
 Gearbox: 6-speed sequential semi-automatic gearbox
 Weight:  excluding driver and fuel
 Power output: 
 Length: 
 Width: 
 Wheelbase: 
 Steering: rack and pinion

Champions

Drivers'

Teams'

Circuits 

 Bold denotes a current circuit used in the 2022 season.

See also 

 Formula Three
 United States Formula Three Championship
 Formula 4 United States Championship
 U.S. F2000 National Championship
 Formula Lites
 Road to Indy
 Indy Pro 2000 Championship (U.S. regional F2000/F4-class)
 Indy Lights (U.S. regional F2500/F3/GP3-class)
 IndyCar Series (U.S. regional F3000/F2/GP2-class)

References

External links

 F3 Americas Championship - official website

Formula Regional Americas Championship
Auto racing series in the United States
Recurring sporting events established in 2018